A Mighty Flood is an album by singer, multi-instrumentalist and songwriter Leon Russell. Billboard magazine on October 2, 2010, called a A Mighty Flood "a recent treat" and a "buoyant 2008 gospel album". The album was produced by Russell and released in 2008 by Leon Russell Records. After A Mighty Flood Leon's next album was his 2010 collaboration album with Elton John, The Union

Track listing
All songs written and performed by Leon Russell:
 	A Mighty Flood 	3:11
 	I See the Light 	3:28
 	Golden Wings 	3:53
 	Inside the Angels 	4:05
 	Jesus Is Watching 	4:33
 	Judge Not 	3:40
 	The Road to Jerico 	3:40
 	Say Yes to Jesus 	2:25
 	Slow Train 	3:34
 	When Jesus Comes 	2:48
 	Unforgiven 	4:48

References

External links
Leon Russell discography
Leon Russell lyrics
Leon Russell NAMM Oral History Program Interview (2012)

2008 albums
Leon Russell albums
Albums produced by Leon Russell